The Blue Raider Network is the sports radio network for the Middle Tennessee State University Athletic teams, the Middle Tennessee Blue Raiders. It broadcasts men's and women's basketball, as well as football and baseball games. The events are broadcast over six radio stations, and a few of the station's translators.  

The network is a joint unit of the university's broadcasting department and Learfield Sports.

On-air personnel
Chip Walters—Play-by-play commentary (Football and Men's Basketball)
Dick Palmer—Play-by-play commentary (Baseball and Women's Basketball)
Kyle Turnham - Color Analyst (Men's Basketball) 
Dennis Burke - Color Analyst (Football)
Duane Hickey - Color Analyst (Women's Basketball)

Radio stations

Blue Raider Television Network
In some cases, some MTSU Blue Raiders football, basketball, and (to a lesser extent) baseball games are shown on Nashville area MyNetworkTV affiliate WUXP-TV. The broadcasts would be either legit from the Blue Raider Network itself, or via the syndicated Conference USA package by the ad hoc American Sports Network, which started operations in late August 2014 by the Sinclair Broadcasting Group (the owner of WUXP and WZTV).

References

College basketball on the radio in the United States
College football on the radio
Middle Tennessee State University
Murfreesboro, Tennessee
Sports radio networks in the United States
Mass media in Rutherford County, Tennessee
Learfield IMG College sports radio networks